Mike "Thatcher" Baker is a fictional player character appearing in Tom Clancy's Rainbow Six Siege, a 2015 tactical online first-person shooter video game. Thatcher is one of the original operators, dubbed 'pathfinders', who debuted in the game's first season, which was released on December 1, 2015. He is voiced by Jamie Muffett.

Within Rainbow Six Siege lore, Thatcher is a soldier in the Special Air Services (SAS), a special forces outfit of the British Army. He is depicted as an operator with considerable field experience and expertise in SAS tactics, and is positioned in a mentoring role to newcomer Operators. Thatcher is considered to be one of the most popular playable characters in Rainbow Six Siege, due to the low learning curve of his gameplay abilities. Some commentators, including Ubisoft's developmental team, later considered the character to be one-note in terms of gameplay, which results in the character's moveset being tweaked or overhauled entirely in later updates for the game.

Development and release 
Thatcher takes his moniker after Margaret Thatcher, the British Prime Minister during the three conflicts he fought in; the Falklands War, the Iranian Embassy siege, and the first Gulf War. Commenting on Thatcher's development in a video produced by American magazine Wired, Ubisoft's art director Alexander Karpazis, said that "Thatcher is absolutely named after Margaret Thatcher, where he was part of Operation Nimrod, the assault on the Iranian Embassy in London." He further added that "If you search for Margaret Thatcher Operation Nimrod, you’ll find a photo of her standing with three SAS guys – the guy in the middle is Thatcher."

In July 2018, the game's developers indicated that they were dissatisfied with Thatcher's gameplay mechanics within the context of "the interaction of the EMP and electronic gadgets when this interaction is a simple destruction." Game designer Jean-Baptiste Hallé took the view that the original design of his special EMP grenade was too "binary" and did not allow adequate room for creative use or counterplays. In an interview with PC Gamer, game director Leroy Athabassoff revealed that Thatcher was in the process of being reworked, noting that his EMP grenade will only disable cameras with EMP instead of destroying them as part of an upcoming update.

Release 
On December 1, 2015, Ubisoft released Rainbow Six Siege after testing on a closed beta. The original game featured 20 operators including Thatcher. His loadout options included the AR33 and L85A2 automatic assault rifles and P226 Mk 25 as a sidearm. Thatcher had access to EG MKO-EMP Grenades. These grenades, three of which can be deployed in a single round, disable all electronics that fall inside its area of effect.

On February 19, 2018, Ubisoft announced that it would be making its original 20 operators free of cost. Since Thatcher is one of the original operators, he is unlocked automatically when a player buys the game.

Thatcher appears as a DLC character in Tom Clancy's Ghost Recon Breakpoint, in the Operation Amber Sky event.

Post-release 
In Y1S1.0 patch (Operation Black Ice), the M590A1 shotgun was added to Thatcher's loadout options.

In Y1S2.0 patch (Operation Dustline), his EMP grenades were nerfed. The grenade's effective range was reduced from 7 to 5.2 metres. Additionally, his EMP gadget was buffed to disable enemies' electronic sights for 10 seconds.

In Y5S3.0 patch (Operation Shadow Legacy), his EMP grenades were further nerfed to only disable, not destroy, gadgets for 15 seconds. He was the sole operator to have significant gadget reworking in the Operation Shadow Legacy.

On April 6, 2018, Thatcher received his Elite Skin rework. Labelled Operation Nimrod, the Elite Skin of Thatcher was the first to reveal the operator's face. The Elite Skin uniforms closely resemble those worn during the Iranian Embassy siege. The accompanying medal on his chest further confirm that Thatcher took part in the hostage rescue situation.

Appearances 
Within series lore, Thatcher hails from Bideford, England, and joined military service at the age of 18, much to the chagrin of his family. He has been awarded the Distinguished Flying Cross and Conspicuous Gallantry Cross for services rendered in conflicts. He holds the appointment of Regimental Sergeant Major and was the oldest serving member of SAS till he was recruited by Rainbow Team Six.

Thatcher is depicted as plays a mentorship role within the closely-knit Team Six outfit, having built an extensive amount of interpersonal relationships amongst his colleagues and holds a good rapport with most of its operators. Thatcher appears in the CGI short film The Hammer and the Scalpel as one of the protagonists. The short introduces Harishva "Harry" Pandey, the new "Six" leader taking the reigns of Team Six. The film narrates Thatcher as the old school veteran and fellow Team Six operator Grace "Dokkaebi" Nam as the tech-savvy hacker. Depicting a mock-combat scenario, the CGI animation highlights the contrasting approaches to combat as both operators come to grips with each other's operational perspectives and working dynamics of a diverse team. The short film outlines the importance of an old guard and new blood through its story-telling and aims to expand the lore beyond the in-game bios. Thatcher face was revealed in May 2018 when the elite skin himself was released during Operation Para Bellum.

Thatcher also features in the Ubisoft special film screened at the final for its major Rainbow Six Siege tournament, the Six Invitational 2020. Titled as Tournament of Champions, Thatcher appears in pre/post-match interviews with fellow SAS and Team Six operator Sheamus "Sledge" Cowden.

Reception 
Thatcher is one of the most popular operators in Rainbow Six Siege. His gadget is straightforward to use and can be utilized as support. His weapon loadout is adequate and the operator itself is straightforward to use. Thatcher has a very high ban rate of 2021, which has been interpreted as an indicator that the character is overly powerful. Chris Moyse from Destructoid praised The Hammer and The Scalpel, as it adds character and personality to "black-clad, gas-mask wearing heavies" like Thatcher.

PC Gamer describes Thatcher as "The perfect wingman for a good attack" and further notes that "against a savvy team, your hard breachers will be useless without Thatcher's support." Screen Rant ranks the operator as the first pick for newbies in its listing, stating that "..Thatcher a great character to learn the game with - he can give new players a solid foundation for developing a gameplan on the attack, as well as how to execute that plan and back up one's teammates". PCGamesN described Thatcher's face as that of a "friendly dad" when it was revealed in 2018 when his elite skin was released during Operation Para Bellum.

Thatcher's easy-to-use utility for newcomer players is supported by Dave Irwin from Rock, Paper, Shotgun, who noted the character as "almost universally a decent pick", as his EMP grenades "play havoc with many of the defender's skills, while his guns are highly competitive". Irwin emphasized that being "simple to understand doesn't mean he's limited in any way".

References 

Fictional British people in video games
Fictional English people
Fictional Gulf War veterans
Fictional martial artists in video games
Fictional military sergeants
Fictional police officers in video games
Fictional soldiers in video games
Fictional Special Air Service personnel
Male characters in video games
Tom Clancy characters
Ubisoft characters
Video game characters introduced in 2015